Richard Joseph Regan (November 30, 1930 – December 24, 2002) was an American basketball player and coach who played in the NBA for the Rochester / Cincinnati Royals

Raised in Newark, New Jersey, Regan played prep basketball at West Side High School.

The  Regan played collegiately at Seton Hall University during the early 1950s.  His team made three consecutive appearances in the National Invitation Tournament, winning in 1953.  After graduation, he was selected by the Rochester Royals with the fifth pick of the 1953 NBA draft. after two years serving in the United States Marine Corps, Regan played three seasons with the Royals and averaged 8.3 points per game. He appeared in the 1957 NBA All-Star Game.

Regan later served as a basketball coach and athletic director at Seton Hall.

A resident of Sea Girt, New Jersey, Regan died of heart failure at the age of 72.

NBA career statistics

Regular season

Playoffs

References

External links
 NBA statistics
 Obituary

1930 births
2002 deaths
American men's basketball players
Basketball coaches from New Jersey
Basketball players from Newark, New Jersey
Cincinnati Royals players
National Basketball Association All-Stars
People from Sea Girt, New Jersey
Point guards
Rochester Royals draft picks
Rochester Royals players
Seton Hall Pirates athletic directors
Seton Hall Pirates men's basketball coaches
Seton Hall Pirates men's basketball players
Shooting guards
United States Marines
West Side High School (New Jersey) alumni